The  William G. Low House was a seaside cottage at 3 Low Lane in Bristol, Rhode Island.

It was designed and built in 1886–1887 by architect Charles McKim of the New York City firm, McKim, Mead & White. With its distinctive single  gable it embodied many of the tenets of Shingle Style architecture—horizontality, simplified massing and geometry, minimal ornamentation, the blending of interior and exterior spaces.

The architectural historian Vincent Scully saw it as "at once a climax and a kind of conclusion" for McKim, since its "prototypal form ... was almost immediately to be abandoned for the more conventionally conceived columns and pediments of McKim, Mead, and White's later buildings."

Just before it was demolished in 1962, the house was documented with measured drawings and photographs by the Historic American Buildings Survey.

Wrote architectural historian Leland Roth, "Although little known in its own time, the Low House has come to represent the high mark of the Shingle Style."

References

External links

Low House floor plans from Great Buildings Online

McKim, Mead & White buildings
Houses completed in 1886
Houses in Bristol County, Rhode Island
Demolished buildings and structures in Rhode Island
Shingle Style houses
Queen Anne architecture in Rhode Island
Historic American Buildings Survey in Rhode Island
Buildings and structures demolished in 1962
Shingle Style architecture in Rhode Island
Gilded Age mansions